Operation Banquet was a British naval operation in World War II, under the command of Rear Admiral Clement Moody. The objective was to carry out aerial strikes on Japanese positions in and around Padang, on the southwestern coast of Sumatra, Indonesia, on 24 August 1944. The forces involved successfully struck the primary targets of the attack, these being the Padang airfield, the Indaroeng cement works, and the harbor facilities and shipping at Emmahaven.

Background 
Indomitable was carrying 28 F6F Hellcat fighters under Lieutenant Commander T. G. C. Jameson and 28 Fairey Barracuda bombers under Lieutenant Commander E. M. Britten. Many of the pilots were inexperienced, and the British hoped that the mission would provide some additional training for them.
The plan was to attack Padang airfield, Emmahaven harbour and the Indaroeng cement works. The cement works was the only facility of its kind in South-East Asia. If it was destroyed, the Japanese would be unable to construct fortifications or new buildings in the region. The raid was also supposed to draw away attention from the American landings at Hollandia and Aitape. In addition to this, photographs would be taken for reconnaissance purposes.

The strike force set out from Trincomalee on 19 August. The force delayed for 24 hours so the submarine  could replace , which was experiencing technical difficulties. The cruisers and destroyers refuelled on 23 August from the replenishment oiler .

Operation 
The strike force arrived at its position at 05:00 on 24 August. Howe could not keep up and temporarily fell out of formation. The first strike consisted of 20 Barracudas (10 from each carrier) with 500 lb bombs and an escort of 19 Vought F4U Corsairs. The second strike launched at 07:10, consisting of 12 Barracudas (9 from Indomitable, 3 from Victorious) with an escort of 12 Corsairs (from Victorious).

The port and the airfield were never used by the Japanese, and as such there little was allotted to defend them. There was no air opposition, so the bombers had high hit percentages. A single Corsair was shot down by light anti-aircraft fire.

Aftermath 
In spite of the accurate bombings, the targets proved to be of little strategic value. The new pilots did not gain much experience either, since they encountered only negligible resistance. The operation failed to draw any Japanese pressure off the Americans at Hollandia. The only notable success was the aerial photography from the Wildcats, which yielded excellent results. The operation "marked the first time the British used a two-wave attack by two fleet carriers."

In spite of the relatively small distance covered, Victorious consumed about a quarter of her fuel.

Archival footage of the operation held by the Imperial War Museum shows operational takeoffs and landings by Fairey Barracudas, F6F Hellcats, and Vought F4U Corsairs.

References 

World War II operations and battles of the Southeast Asia Theatre
Naval aviation operations and battles
World War II aerial operations and battles of the Pacific theatre
Aerial operations and battles of World War II involving the United Kingdom
Naval battles and operations of World War II involving the United Kingdom